Věroslav Valenta (born 25 March 1965) is a Czech athlete. He competed in the men's decathlon at the 1988 Summer Olympics.

References

External links
 

1965 births
Living people
Athletes (track and field) at the 1988 Summer Olympics
Czech decathletes
Olympic athletes of Czechoslovakia
People from Litomyšl
Sportspeople from the Pardubice Region